Lauren Michelle Stephens (née Robertson; born December 28, 1986) is an American racing cyclist, who currently rides for UCI Women's WorldTeam . She raced the Team Time Trial at the 2014 UCI Road World Championships.

Major results

2013
 7th Philadelphia Cycling Classic
2014
 3rd White Spot / Delta Road Race
 4th Overall Belgium Tour
 8th Winston-Salem Cycling Classic
2015
 1st  Overall Joe Martin Stage Race
1st Stage 1 (ITT)
 2nd Overall Tour Femenino de San Luis
1st Stage 4 (ITT)
 2nd Overall Tour de Feminin-O cenu Českého Švýcarska
1st  Points classification
 2nd Overall Tour Cycliste Féminin International de l'Ardèche
1st Stage 1 (ITT)
 3rd Overall Tour of the Gila
1st Stage 3 (ITT)
 3rd Overall Thüringen Rundfahrt der Frauen
 4th Time trial, National Road Championships
 4th Overall Armed Forces Association Cycling Classic
1st Clarendon Cup
 5th Chrono Gatineau
 6th Gran Prix San Luis Femenino
 7th Winston-Salem Cycling Classic
 8th Overall Women's Tour of New Zealand
 8th Overall Tour of California
2016
 1st Matrix Challenge Criterium 1
 1st Stage 4 (ITT) Tour Femenino de San Luis
 3rd Overall Joe Martin Stage Race
1st Stage 4
 4th Overall Tour Femenino de San Luis
1st Stage 4 (ITT)
 4th Chrono Gatineau
 5th Time trial, National Road Championships
 6th North Star Grand Prix
 7th Overall Tour of the Gila
 10th Overall Tour of California
2017
 1st Chrono Gatineau
 1st Winston-Salem Cycling Classic
 Matrix Challenge
1st Criteriums 1 & 2
 1st Stage 3 (ITT) Tour Cycliste Féminin International de l'Ardèche
 1st Stage 4 (ITT) Thüringen Rundfahrt der Frauen
 National Road Championships
2nd Time trial
2nd Criterium
6th Road race
 2nd Overall Joe Martin Stage Race
 3rd Overall Valley of the Sun Stage Race
 5th Overall Tour of the Gila
 5th Grand Prix Cycliste de Gatineau
 6th Dana Point Grand Prix
 7th Overall Tour of California
 7th GP de Plouay – Bretagne
 7th La Course by Le Tour de France
 8th Time trial, UCI Road World Championships
 9th Overall Redlands Bicycle Classic
1st Stage 3
2018
 1st GP Jodofi
 1st reVolta
 2nd  Time trial, Pan American Road Championships
 2nd Overall Women's Tour Down Under
2019
 1st Unbound Gravel 100
 7th Overall Women's Tour Down Under
 7th Overall Colorado Classic
 7th Winston-Salem Cycling Classic
 9th Overall Tour Cycliste Féminin International de l'Ardèche
 9th Chrono Gatineau
 10th Tour of Guangxi
2020
 1st  Overall Tour Cycliste Féminin International de l'Ardèche
1st  Points classification
1st  Combination classification
 4th Overall Women's Tour Down Under
 4th Race Torquay
 4th UCI Esports World Championships
 6th Gent–Wevelgem
 7th Cadel Evans Great Ocean Road Race
 9th Time trial, UCI Road World Championships
 9th Tour of Flanders for Women
 10th Brabantse Pijl Dames Gooik
2021
 1st  Road race, National Road Championships
 1st Unbound Gravel 100
 10th Gent–Wevelgem

References

External links
 
 

1986 births
Living people
American female cyclists
People from Mesquite, Texas
21st-century American women
Cyclists from Texas